Dickie Owen (26 March 1927 – 7 April 2015) was a British actor primarily known for his roles in Zulu, The Curse of the Mummy's Tomb and The Mummy's Shroud.

Owen largely retired from acting in the 1970s and worked as a radio dispatcher for a cab company. After a long public absence, he was interviewed in 2011 about his experiences making Zulu.

Filmography

Films

References

External links

 Zulu Film Store

1927 births
2015 deaths
British male film actors
British male television actors
20th-century British male actors
Place of birth missing